Ananthu may refer to:

Ananthu (screenwriter), Indian Tamil-language screenwriter
Ananthu (singer), Indian Tamil-language singer
Ananthu vs Nusrath, Indian Kannada-language film